The 2017 Jubilee Trophy (part of the Toyota National Championships for sponsorship reasons) is the national championship for women's soccer clubs in Canada.  It was held in Surrey, British Columbia from October 4-9, 2017.

Teams 
Nine teams were granted entry into the competition; one from each Canadian province excluding Manitoba and Prince Edward Island.  As host, British Columbia was permitted a second entry into the competition.  This field of nine teams represents a decrease of one team from the ten sides that contested the 2016 Jubilee Trophy.

Teams are selected by their provincial soccer associations; most often qualifying by winning provincial leagues or cup championships such as the Ontario Cup.

Group stage
The nine teams in the competition are divided into three groups of three teams each, which then play a single-game round-robin format.  At the end of group play, each team faces the equal-ranked teams from the other groups in another single-game round-robin format to determine a final classification for the tournament.

Group A

Group B

Group C

Classification stage

First classification group

Second classification group

Third classification group

Tournament Ranking

Top Goalscorers 

Source:

References

External links 
 Canadian Soccer Association National Championships 

Jubilee
Soccer in British Columbia
Sport in Surrey, British Columbia